Rec (stylized as [•REC]) is a Spanish supernatural zombie horror film franchise. The original 2007 film was shot in Barcelona, Catalonia and the title is an abbreviation of the word "record", as it appears on a video camera.

Rec was followed by three sequels; Rec 2 in 2009, Rec 3: Genesis in 2012, and Rec 4: Apocalypse in 2014 as the final installment in the franchise. Spanish company Filmax is responsible for the production of the REC franchise and released all four installments.

The series lead protagonist, Ángela Vidal, is portrayed by actress Manuela Velasco in all the films except Rec 3: Genesis.

Actor Javier Botet portrays Tristana Medeiros, the series main antagonist.

The first film was remade in the United States as the 2008 film Quarantine. Quarantine 2: Terminal was released in 2011. Although the sequel's plot picks up directly from where Quarantine leaves off, it is not a remake of Rec 2. Quarantine 2: Terminal takes the series in a completely different direction with its own rules and mythology different from those of the Rec series.

Cast 
 This table shows the principal characters and the actors who have portrayed them throughout the franchise.
 A dark grey cell indicates the character was not in the film, or that the character's presence in the film has not yet been announced.
 A  indicates a cameo appearance.
 A  indicates an appearance in archival footage only.
 A  indicates a voice only role.

Cast (remakes)

References

External links
 
 
 
 

 
Spanish horror films
Demons in film
Films about infectious diseases
Found footage films
Religious horror films
Spanish supernatural horror films
Camcorder films
Films set in 2006
Films set in Barcelona
Films shot in Barcelona
Horror film series
Filmax films
Castelao Producciones films